"Is That a Tear" is a song written by John Jarrard and Kenny Beard, and recorded by American country music artist Tracy Lawrence.  It was released on November 26, 1996 as the fourth and final single from his album Time Marches On.  It peaked at number two on the United States Billboard Hot Country Singles & Tracks chart, while it was a number-one hit in Canada.

Content
"Is That a Tear" is a mid-tempo song prominently featuring the fiddle and steel guitar. It begins when the narrator finds an unexpected message on his phone from an estranged lover. In the message, she says she's sorry she missed him and that she's doing fine. He plays the message over and over again, swearing he heard sadness and regret, or "a tear" in her voice. The song ends with the narrator contemplating whether he should call her back.

Music video
The music video was directed by Marc Ball, and is one of many music videos Lawrence filmed in the mid 1990s that featured a "quantum leap" theme (with Marc Ball as director). Beginning with the ending of the video for "Texas Tornado," it features Lawrence driving a taxicab, and helping a woman follow a group of men for an undisclosed purpose. It was also the last video to feature Lawrence's trademark mullet and mustache, which he sported from the beginning of his career in 1991 to approximately 1996.

Chart positions

Year-end charts

References

1996 songs
Tracy Lawrence songs
1996 singles
Songs written by John Jarrard
Atlantic Records singles
Songs written by Kenny Beard